L'Île-Bizard is a former municipality current borough located on Île Bizard, an island northwest of the Island of Montreal. It was originally incorporated as a municipality on 1 July 1855 as Paroisse de Saint-Raphael-de l'Ile-Bizard.

On 1 January 2002, it was merged into the City of Montreal as part of the borough of L'Île-Bizard–Sainte-Geneviève.

The island has a land area of 22.77 km² (8.79 sq mi). Its population was 14,647 at the 2011 census.

Parc-Nature-du-Bois-de-l'île-Bizard is located in the centre of the island.

It is the childhood home of NHL hockey player Vincent Lecavalier, who attended John Rennie High School, a school well known for its athletics program.

The Parti Québécois leader Pauline Marois had a $8M main residence in the area. She is currently building another home on the island.

Demographics

See also
 Montreal Merger
 Municipal reorganization in Quebec

References

Community Profile: L'Île-Bizard, Québec; Statistics Canada

Populated places disestablished in 2002
Neighbourhoods in Montreal
Former municipalities in Quebec
Former cities in Quebec
L'Île-Bizard–Sainte-Geneviève